Ida Lien (born 5 April 1997) is a Norwegian biathlete.

Career results

Olympic Games

World Championships

World Cup

References

External links
 
 
 
 

1997 births
Living people
Norwegian female biathletes
Sportspeople from Drammen
Biathlon World Championships medalists
Olympic biathletes of Norway
Biathletes at the 2022 Winter Olympics
21st-century Norwegian women